The 2016 United States presidential election in Utah was held on November 8, 2016, as part of the 2016 United States presidential election which was also held in the other 49 states and in the District of Columbia. Voters were asked to pick 6 electors to be pledged for a candidate in the Electoral College. The two main tickets of the election were the Republican one, consisting of businessman Donald Trump and Indiana Governor Mike Pence, and the Democratic one, consisting of former Secretary of State Hillary Clinton and Virginia Senator Tim Kaine.

On March 22, 2016, in the presidential primaries, Utah voters expressed their preferences for the Democratic and Republican parties' respective nominees for president. The state uses a system of semi-closed primaries, meaning that voters registered with a specific party can vote in that party's primary, while voters who are unaffiliated can vote in the primary of one party of their choosing. Utah was won by Trump, who won the state with 45.5 percent of the vote, the lowest percentage for any Republican since George H. W. Bush in 1992. Clinton received 27.5 percent of the vote, and Republican-turned-independent candidate Evan McMullin received 21.5 percent. 

The 18.08 point margin was the closest a Democrat has come to winning Utah since 1964, when Lyndon B. Johnson won by 9.73%. However, this was due to McMullin's strong third-party showing limiting Trump to under 50% of the vote; Clinton received a smaller percentage of the popular vote than five other Democrats in this same time period (Barack Obama in 2008, Bill Clinton in 1996, Michael Dukakis in 1988, Jimmy Carter in 1976, and Hubert Humphrey in 1968). This was one of only three states, the others being Idaho and Vermont, where the Libertarian Party candidate Gary Johnson did not obtain third place, as McMullin beat him in Idaho and Utah, and write-in votes for Bernie Sanders (who was no longer running for president) beat him in Vermont. Trump also became the first Republican to win the White House without carrying Salt Lake County since William McKinley in 1896.

Caucus elections

The incumbent President of the United States, Barack Obama, a Democrat, was first elected president in the 2008 election, running with Joe Biden of Delaware. Defeating the Republican nominee, Senator John McCain of Arizona, with 52.9 percent of the popular vote and 68 percent of the electoral vote, Obama succeeded two-term Republican President George W. Bush, the former Governor of Texas. Obama and Biden were reelected in the 2012 presidential election, defeating former Massachusetts Governor Mitt Romney with 51.1 percent of the popular vote and 61.7 percent of electoral votes. Although Barack Obama's approval rating in the RealClearPolitics poll tracking average remained between 40 and 50 percent for most of his second term, it experienced a surge in early 2016 and reached its highest point since 2012 during June of that year. Analyst Nate Cohn noted that a strong approval rating for President Obama would equate to a strong performance for the Democratic candidate, and vice versa.

Following his second term, President Obama was not eligible for another reelection. In October 2015, Obama's running-mate and two-term Vice President Biden decided not to enter the race for the Democratic presidential nomination either. With their term expiring on January 20, 2017, the electorate was asked to elect a new president, the 45th president and 48th vice president of the United States, respectively.

Democratic caucus

Four candidates appeared on the Democratic presidential caucus ballot:
Hillary Clinton
Bernie Sanders
Martin O'Malley (withdrawn)

Republican caucus
Three candidates appeared on the Republican presidential caucus ballot: 
Ted Cruz
John Kasich
Donald Trump

General election

Voting History

The state of Utah has given its electoral votes to the Republican ticket in every election year since 1968 and only once voted for a Democratic candidate in elections since 1952 (in 1964). The state has a majority of members of the Church of Jesus Christ of Latter-day Saints (LDS Church) population, which on the national level voted 78 percent to 21 percent for Mitt Romney in 2012. This very heavily contributed to Mitt Romney winning the state by a margin of 73 percent to 25 percent in the 2012 election. However, Donald Trump's criticism of Romney's faith on the campaign trail in 2016 angered many Republican voters. Polls suggested that Utah might be a strong state for Libertarian candidate Gary Johnson as a protest vote against Trump. As a result, Larry Sabato's online election forecaster, Sabato's Crystal Ball, downgraded their rating of the Utah contest from "Safe Republican" to "Likely Republican" on June 23.

Evan McMullin, a conservative independent candidate, had also been viewed by voters in Utah as another alternative, given that it is also his home state. According to one poll released on October 12, Trump and Clinton were seen as virtually tied in Utah at 26%, with McMullin polling at 22%. McMullin's rise was the result of further Republican backlash against Trump following the release of a controversial video from 2005 showing Trump bragging about obscene sexual conduct with women. In a HeatStreet poll conducted from October 15–16, McMullin was polled in second place with 29% of likely voters, coming behind Trump who polled at 30%, and ahead of Clinton who polled at 28 percent. In a poll conducted by Emerson College from October 17–19 with a sample size of 700 people, McMullin placed first with 31 percent ahead of Trump by a 4 percent margin, who had 27 percent of support, while Clinton polled in third at 24 percent. This was the first conducted statewide opinion poll of the 2016 election where a third-party candidate has placed first.

Had McMullin won Utah, he would have become the first nationally nonpartisan candidate since George Washington to win a state in 224 years since Washington's reelection in 1792, and ultimately the first nonpartisan candidate to win a state west of the Mississippi River.

Predictions

Polling

Donald Trump won almost every poll, except for one poll showing him tied with Hillary Clinton and Evan McMullin, and another showing McMullin with 31% of the vote, ahead of Trump's 27% and Clinton's 24%. The polling was close due to the large percentage of people polled who were voting for McMullin. The final RCP average showed Trump with 37% to Clinton's 27%, Evan McMullin's 25% and Gary Johnson with 3.5%.

Candidates on the ballot
The following candidates were listed on the ballot:
 Donald Trump & Mike Pence (Republican Party)
 Evan McMullin & Nathan Johnson (Not affiliated with any Party)
 Hillary Clinton & Tim Kaine (Democratic Party)
 Gary Johnson & William Weld (Libertarian Party)
 Darrell Castle & Scott N. Bradley (Constitution Party)
 Jill Stein & Ajamu Baraka (Green Party)
 Rocky De La Fuente & Michael Steinberg (Reform Party)
 Rocky Giordani & Farley Anderson (Independent American Party)
 Alyson Kennedy & Osborne Hart (Socialist Workers Party)
 Monica Moorehead & Lamont Lilly (Workers World Party)

Candidates not on the ballot
The following were certified by the state as "write-in candidates", which means that votes given to these persons would be counted:

Results

Results by county

Counties that flipped from Republican to Democratic 

Salt Lake (largest city: Salt Lake City)
Summit (largest city: Park City)

By congressional district
Trump won all four congressional districts.

Analysis

Utah gave the Republican nominee a 45 percent plurality and thus awarded him six electoral votes. This was the lowest percent of the vote Trump received in a state he won in 2016. Trump received a much lower percentage of the vote in Utah than did Mitt Romney in 2012. In particular, Trump underperformed Romney by over 30 percentage points in the Provo-Orem, Logan, and Ogden metropolitan areas. Meanwhile, Clinton improved on Obama's performance in all of these areas. Trump received only 45 percent of the vote among Utah members of the LDS Church, barely half the proportion that Romney won in 2012. This was also much lower than the 61 percent of the LDS Church's vote Trump received nationally.

Evan McMullin's 21.3 percent of the vote is the strongest third-party performance in any state since Ross Perot during the 1992 presidential election. He finished second ahead of Clinton in fifteen of Utah's twenty-nine counties, becoming the first third-party candidate since Perot to outpoll a major party candidate in any county nationwide, and only the fifth since 1928 to do so in any non-Southern county. In Utah County, he received almost thirty percent of the vote, about twice as much as Clinton and more than any non-Republican presidential candidate since 1968.

See also
 United States presidential elections in Utah
 Presidency of Donald Trump
 2016 Democratic Party presidential debates and forums
 2016 Democratic Party presidential primaries
 2016 Republican Party presidential debates and forums
 2016 Republican Party presidential primaries

Notes

References

External links
 RNC 2016 Republican Nominating Process 
 Green papers for 2016 primaries, caucuses, and conventions
 Official final canvass

UT
2016
Presidential